William Morton was an American politician. He served as the sixteenth mayor of Lancaster, Pennsylvania from 1886 to 1888.

References

Mayors of Lancaster, Pennsylvania
19th-century American politicians